Meredo is one of six parishes in Vegadeo, a municipality within the province and autonomous community of Asturias, in northern Spain. 

Villages and hamlets
 Bustelo
 A Ferraría
 Meredo
 Molexón (Molejón)
 Nafaría (Nafarea)
 Penzol
 A Quintá
 Vinxói (Vinjoy)
 Xaraz
 Seladaloura

References

Parishes in Vegadeo